Steve Reich: Triple Quartet is a studio album by the Kronos Quartet and other artists. The music was composed by Steve Reich and was commissioned by the quartet; Reich and the quartet have worked together since 1989.

Compositions and performers
Triple Quartet was composed in 1999 and since then has been in the quartet's live repertoire. It is a three-movement work for three string quartets; on the album, quartets two and three are pre-recorded and the players play the first quartet along with the tape, as they do live.

Besides the Kronos Quartet's version of Triple Quartet, the album contains three other Reich pieces. Electric Guitar Phase, one of Reich's "phase pieces," is played by New York guitar player Dominic Frasca. The composition is an updated version of the 1967 Violin Phase arranged for guitar and tape (or four guitars). Alan Pierson conducts Alarm Will Sound and the Ossia Ensemble from the Eastman School of Music, which perform Reich's 1978 Music for a Large Ensemble. The final track is Mika Yoshida's rendition of Tokyo/Vermont Counterpoint, performed on MIDI marimba.

Track listing

Credits

Musicians
David Harrington – violin
John Sherba – violin
Hank Dutt – viola
Jennifer Culp – cello
Terry Riley – piano
Dominic Frasca – electric guitar
Mika Yoshida – MIDI marimba
Alan Pierson – vibraphone, conductor of Alarm Will Sound and Ossia Ensemble

Production
Triple Quartet recorded March and April 1999, August 2000 at Skywalker Sound, Nicasio, California
John Kilgore – engineer
Dann Thompson – assistant engineer
Bob Levy – assistant engineer
Electric Guitar Phase recorded January 2001 at DV8 Studios, New York City
Dominic Frasca – arranger, producer, engineer
Music for Large Ensemble recorded May, September 2000 at the Kresge Recording Studios of the Eastman School of Music, Rochester, NY, produced by Alan Pierson, Clay Greenberg, and Rob Haskins
Justin Volpe – engineer
Tokyo/Vermont Counterpoint recorded March 1998 at Toms Studio, Hondo City, Kumamoto, Japan, arranged and produced by Mika Yoshida
Hidenori Shimada – engineer

See also
List of 2001 albums

References 

2001 albums
Kronos Quartet albums
Nonesuch Records albums